Gusto, Inc. is a company that provides a cloud-based payroll, benefits, and human resource management software for businesses based in the United States. Gusto handles payments to employees and contractors and also handles electronically the paperwork necessary to help client companies comply with tax, labor, and immigration laws. Gusto is operational in all 50 US states.

History
Gusto was part of Y Combinator's Winter 2012 batch. The service launched officially on December 11, 2012 in California by Joshua Reeves, Tomer London and Edward Kim.

On June 12, 2013, Gusto announced support for paying contract workers, including making sure of tax compliance (by filing the relevant Form 1099 and other paperwork). This was touted by some technology writers as giving the company an advantage over competitors such as ADP and Paychex, whose payroll software was claimed to lack the flexibility to accommodate contract workers. The company also announced plans to launch services in Florida, Texas, and New York state.  

In August 2013, Gusto announced that it had crossed $100 million in payments processed annually, and was launching in Florida, Texas, and Washington state. In September 2014, Gusto announced its application programming interface (API) and partnerships with over a dozen small and medium business (SMB) back-office service companies. In December 2014, Gusto announced support for letting companies match employees' charitable donations.

In April 2015, Gusto announced support for all 50 states. In July 2015, Gusto announced that it had expanded its business and opened a new office in Denver, Colorado. In September 2015, it was announced that ZenPayroll had changed its name to Gusto, and was broadening its focus to integrate health benefits and workers' compensation into its payroll software. In 2016, the firm launched an ad campaign featuring Kristen Schaal playing a Gusto human resources representative.

In 2019, Gusto announced the opening of its third location, the new office is located in New York City.

In 2020, Gusto is making a push to sign up more accounting firms as partners and earn its People Advisory Certification.

In June 2021, Gusto announced that it will now offer part of its service via an API to external platforms. The new product “Gusto Embedded Payroll,” will allow vertical SaaS companies to provide payroll support to their own customers.

Funding
In December 2012, Gusto announced that, back in April 2012 upon graduating from Y Combinator's Winter 2012 class, ZenPayroll had raised the largest seed round for a Y Combinator startup. The total amount of $6.1 million was raised from investors including Box CEO and co-founder Aaron Levie, Yammer CEO and co-founder David O. Sacks, Dropbox CEO and co-founder Drew Houston, YouTube co-founder Jawed Karim, Yelp CEO and co-founder Jeremy Stoppelman, Badgeville CEO and co-founder Kris Duggan, SugarCRM CEO Larry Augustin, and Zuora CEO and co-founder Tien Tzuo, as well as Google Ventures, Data Collective, Sherpalo Ventures, and Salesforce.com.

On February 19, 2014, Gusto announced a $20 million Series A funding round at a valuation of over $100 million. The round was led by General Catalyst Partners, with Kleiner Perkins Caufield & Byers also participating.

In April 2015, the company secured $60M in Series B funding. The round was led by Google Capital.

In December 2015, Gusto raised $50 million in an opportunistic round that valued the company at $1 billion.

In July 2018, Gusto completed a $140M Series B funding. The round was led by CapitalG, Dragoneer Investment Group, T. Rowe Price and Y Combinator, followed by Kleiner Perkins, General Catalyst, Emergence, SWS Venture Capital, etc.

In July 2019, Gusto raised $200 million at a $3.8 billion valuation.

Reception
Venture Beat reported on Gusto's price hike on August 10, 2016, stating “Gusto rationalized the increase as the result of... recent improvements, such as the launch of integrated health benefits, an 'enhanced' employee on-boarding experience that includes I-9 support and welcome emails, paid time-off tracking, and multiple pay rate tools.”  However, in a Gusto-issued press release on September 17, 2015, the company announced many of these features: “For the first time... with Gusto, employees can easily: — Learn about their benefits, enroll or make changes to their health plans, through their personal Gusto accounts. — Contact Gusto’s dedicated care team with their benefits-related questions. — Access their paystub and plan data in one place.” In 2014, when Gusto was named ZenPayroll,VentureBeat listed Gusto among the best back-office software for small businesses. The New York Times has compared Gusto to larger payroll processors such as ADP, citing both advantages and disadvantages. Gusto has been praised by TechCrunch and PandoDaily for offering an easy-to-use service to small businesses and companies using contractors.

Product and pricing
Gusto's core product offering is payroll processing. As part of the core payroll product, Gusto offers employee onboarding (work authorization forms, direct deposit forms, employee information aggregation). Separately, Gusto offers employee health insurance, dental insurance, and vision insurance enrollment and administration. In addition, Gusto offers other employee-benefit and related products through third parties, including 401K and workers' compensation insurance.

In 2020, Gusto has built more than 50 new products in the last year directed toward helping small businesses. Releases included customizable payroll reports, a simplified Paycheck Protection Program (PPP) Loan Forgiveness tracker and a streamlined PPP application report that’s been downloaded more than 80,000 times to date. Nationwide, Gusto enabled more than $2.5 billion worth of approved PPP loans.

Gusto charges a per employee per month fee, similar to other software providers.

References

External links
 

Technology companies of the United States
Technology companies based in the San Francisco Bay Area
Y Combinator companies
Payroll